Largo do Machado Station is an underground station on the Rio de Janeiro Metro that services the neighbourhoods of Catete, Laranjeiras, Cosme Velho and Largo do Machado in the South Zone of Rio de Janeiro. It is located near the Estádio das Laranjeiras.

References

Metrô Rio stations
Railway stations opened in 1981